Wax Ecstatic is the second studio album by American rock band Sponge. It was released on July 2, 1996 through Columbia Records. The album features a more '70s hard rock-influenced sound compared with the band's previous release. It is the band's first album with drummer Charlie Grover, and includes the hit singles "Wax Ecstatic (To Sell Angelina)" and "Have You Seen Mary".

Production
Wax Ectastic was originally intended to be a concept album revolving around the death of a drag queen; instead, only two songs on the album address the subject. The band decided against  the idea of making a concept album, and instead would incorporate new instrumentation along with a more '70s hard rock-influenced sound compared to Rotting Piñata.

Release
Wax Ecstatic was released in July 1996 and peaked at number 60 on the Billboard 200. "Wax Ecstatic (To Sell Angelina)" and "Have You Seen Mary" were released as the first and second singles from the album, and both received significant airplay on radio and MTV. The songs "I Am Anastasia" and "Silence Is Their Drug" also received radio airplay, but were not officially released as singles.

Critical reception

Wax Ecstatic received mostly positive reviews. AllMusic staff writer Stephen Thomas Erlewine said "In order to grow, the group went back to their beginnings, touching on glam rock, arena rock, blues rock, and jangle pop. Although it reveals Rotting Piñata to be somewhat calculating in its approach, Wax Ecstatic, ironically, is a far superior album." Trouser Press wrote that the album "is markedly stripped down from the dense fury of Rotting Piñata, incorporating new instrumentation (piano, saxophone, cello) and working its way through such rootsy numbers as 'The Drag Queens of Memphis' and the album-closing 'Velveteen'."

Track listing
All songs produced by Tim Patalan and Sponge.

 European Version contains "Slower Suicide"

Samplers and promos
All songs produced Tim Patalan and Sponge.

All songs produced by Tim Patalan and Sponge except where noted.

Personnel
 Vinnie Dombroski – vocals, drums, guitar
 Mike Cross – guitar, bass
 Tim Cross – bass
 Joey Mazzola – guitar, backing vocals
 Charlie Grover – drums

Additional personnel
 Tim Patalan – recording
 Andy Patalan & Matt Hanson – recording assistants
 Tim Palmer – mixing, additional production on "Silence Is Their Drug"
 Mark O'Donoughue – mix engineer
 Jamie Seyberth – additional engineering
 Lamont Hyde – engineering assistant
 Steve King – engineer
 Mike Corbett – post production edit
 Howie Weinberg – mastering
 Pablo Mathiason – A&R
 Susan Silver – management
 Stacy Fass – legal
 Gudvi, Chapnick & Oppenheim – business management
 John Jackson – international booking
 Mary Maurer – art direction
 SITE – design
 Melanie Nissen – photography

Additional musicians
 Richard Butler – additional vocals on "I Am Anastasia"
 Johnny Evans – tenor, alto and baritone sax
 Chris Codish – acoustic piano
 Mando Dorame – sax solo on "My Baby Said"
 Steve Baxter – trombone on "My Baby Said"
 Donald Hayes – saxophone on "My Baby Said"
 Anne King – trumpet on "My Baby Said"
 Tim Patalan – cello

Equipment
 Fender guitars and strings
 Naylor amps
 GHS strings
 Sabian cymbals
 Pearl drums
 Vic Firth sticks

Charts

Album

Singles

References

1996 albums
Sponge (band) albums